Chymsydia is a genus of flowering plant in the family Apiaceae with one species, Chymsydia agasylloides, native to the Transcaucasus.

References 

Apioideae
Monotypic Apioideae genera